Booth Savage (born May 21, 1948) is a Canadian film, stage, and television veteran actor.  He is perhaps best known for his role as Team Canada head coach Harry Sinden in the 2006 CBC miniseries, Canada Russia '72.

Career

Savage graduated with a Master of Fine Arts from York University in 1992.

Savage is also a playwright and avid stage actor.  His self-written plays Savage Heat, DADS, Reversing Falls, Pillow Talk, Pajama Games and This Bloody Business have been performed on stages across Canada.  Moreover, he is an original actor member of Toronto's Theatre Passe Muraille and Toronto Free Theatre.  He has performed in over 100 plays in every province and territory in Canada, with the exception of Yukon.

Savage is currently part of the Canadore College Theatre program faculty.

Awards
In 1987, he won a Gemini Award for Best Actor in a Leading Role for his role as Felix Batterinski in Allan King's The Last Season.

Personal life
Savage is married to actress Janet-Laine Green, and has two children.  Their son Tyrone Savage is also an actor.

Filmography

Movies
 Stone Cold Dead (1979)
 Silence of the North (1981) Howard
 Curtains (1983) Amanda's Boyfriend
 Samuel Lount (1985) Edward Kennedy
 Striker's Mountain (1985) Dave Cameron
 The Last Season (1986) Felix Batterinski
 The Photographer's Wife (1991) Gordon
 Harvard Man (2001) Steve Jensen
 Narc (2002) Cecil Mitchum
 Isabelle (2018) Clifford Kane

Television
 For The Record
 Search and Rescue
 Every Person is Guilty
 Maria
 Collaborators
 Say You Are Real
 On  The Evidence
 Top Cops (3 episodes)
 Sweating Bullets
 You've Come a Long Way, Katie (TV miniseries) (1980) (3 Episodes)
 Home Fires (1980) Bruce McLeod (Main role)
 The Littlest Hobo(1980) Truck Driver - Joe (1 Episode)
 Silence of the North (1981) Flier
 Little Gloria... Happy at Last (1982) (2 Episodes)
 Seeing Things (1986) Nick (2 Episodes)
 Philip Marlowe, Private Eye (1986) George Carter (1 Episode)
 Night Heat (1986) Cliff Colclough (1 Episode)
 Hot Shots (1986) Jason 'Jake' West (Main Role, 13 Episodes)
 Chasing Rainbows (1988) 'Chicago' Benny Rose (14 Episodes)
 T. and T. (1988) Harry (1 Episode)
 The Beachcombers (1989) Ted Blake (2 Episodes)
 Sanity Clause (TV movie) (1990) Mike
 Labor of Love (TV movie) (1990)
 The Photographer's Wife (short) (1991) Gordon
 Street Legal (1990–1991) Sid Novak Jr. (3 Episodes)
 Secret Service (1993) Wade (1 Episode)
 Survive the Night (TV movie) (1993) Andrew
 Counterstrike (1993) Malecki (1 Episode)
 E.N.G. (1991, 1993)  Tex Yeager, Terance Graves (respectively) (2 Episodes)
 Thicker Than Blood: The Larry McLinden Story (TV movie) (1994) David Meadows
 Kung Fu: The Legend Continues (1995) Greg Vinson (1 Episode)
 Wind at My Back (1996) Jack Bailey (1 Episode)
 Goosebumps (1998) Tom Morgan (1 Episode)
 Thanks of a Grateful Nation (TV movie) (1998) Gary Wall
 Ricky Nelson: Original Teen Idol (TV movie) (1999) Lew Chudd
 Sanctuary (2001) Sheriff Bill Duer
 Blue Murder (2003) Constable Phil Bishop (1 Episode)
 Bury the Lead (2004) Simon Redner (1 Episode)
 This Is Wonderland (2005) (1 Episode)
 Sue Thomas: F.B. Eye (2005) (1 Episode)
 Swarmed (2005) Agent Doug Heydon
 Missing (2006) Mark Stryker (2 Episodes)
 Canada Russia '72 (2006) Harry Sinden
 The Jane Show - (2007) Brady O'Flynn (4 Episodes)
 Monster Warriors - recurring
  The Call (TV movie) (2008) Brakka
 M.V.P.  - (2008) (2 Episodes)
 Rabbit Fall (2007–2008) Stanton Martinsky (Main Role, 8 Episodes)
 The Listener (2009) Wade Lassiter (1 Episode)
 Being Erica (2009) Larry Horowitz (1 Episode)
 King (2011) Defense Attorney (1 Episode)
 Mr. D (2011–2015) Principal Callaghan (46 Episodes)
 Slasher'' (2016) Ronald Edwards (3 Episodes)

References

External links

Living people
Canadian male film actors
Canadian male television actors
Academic staff of Humber College
Canadian educators
Male actors from New Brunswick
20th-century Canadian dramatists and playwrights
21st-century Canadian dramatists and playwrights
Writers from Fredericton
Canadian male dramatists and playwrights
1948 births
20th-century Canadian male writers
21st-century Canadian male writers
Academic staff of Canadore College